The 2008 World Allround Speed Skating Championships were held in the indoor arena in Berlin, Germany, on 9 and 10 February 2008. The Dutch skaters Paulien van Deutekom and Sven Kramer became world champions.

Women's championships

Day 1

Day 2

Allround results

NQ = Not qualified for the 5000 m (only the best 12 are qualified)DQ = disqualified

Men's championships

Day 1

Day 2

Allround results

NQ = Not qualified for the 10000 m (only the best 12 are qualified)DQ = disqualified

Rules
All 24 participating skaters are allowed to skate the first three distances; 12 skaters may take part on the fourth distance. These 12 skaters are determined by taking the standings on the longest of the first three distances, as well as the samalog standings after three distances, and comparing these lists as follows:

 Skaters among the top 12 on both lists are qualified.
 To make up a total of 12, skaters are then added in order of their best rank on either list. Samalog standings take precedence over the longest-distance standings in the event of a tie.

References
Resultaten op IsuResults.eu

World Allround Speed Skating Championships, 2008
2008 World Allround
World Allround, 2008
Speed skating in Berlin
2008 in Berlin
2008 in German sport